This article is a list of fictional characters who appear in the My-HiME series. Note that while most of these characters appear in both the My-HiME anime and manga series, their roles and relationships differ.

Fuka Academy students

High school

First year students

 
Mai is portrayed as a self-reliant person, hesitant to tell others about her problems. She is a first-year high school student, and her roommate is Mikoto Minagi. Her stated hobbies are working part-time jobs and taking care of Takumi.

In the first episode, Mai and her brother Takumi take a ferry to their new school, Fuka Academy. On the trip, Mai meets Yuuichi Tate, with whom she begins a love-hate relationship. Mai resuscitates a girl who was found in the river, Mikoto Minagi. Mikoto and a mysterious attacker (later shown to be Natsuki Kuga) battle on the ferry, revealing magical powers; during this battle, Mai finds out she has powers similar to the two. Mai meets and befriends many other students, including Mikoto and Natsuki, in episodes 2 and 3. Being informed by Nagi Homura that her brother is in a nearby forest, she finds him under attack by an Orphan. Mai materializes her Elements for the first time and also acquires her Child, Kagutsuchi, which she uses to defeat the Orphan. In the following episodes, Mai continues to fight Orphans along with Mikoto and Natsuki, becoming especially close to Mikoto. Mai picks up a part-time job at the Lindem Baum restaurant, where she works with her future teacher Midori Sugiura.

In the anime, Mai's elements are a set of four golden rings with magatama around her wrists and ankles. The rings allow her to use fire-based attacks and the power of flight. Mai also is capable of creating barriers around herself to block attacks. Mai's HiME mark is located on her right breast, which is said to be controlled by Cancer, her Zodiac sign.

Her Child is Kagutsuchi, a dragon-like creature capable of expelling destructive fire balls and laser-like thermal blasts. Named after a Japanese god of the same name, it is also somewhat associated with whales and dolphins (hence the fin-like protrusions on its face and the sounds which it communicates with). Another obvious reference is the legendary bird phoenix as Kagutsuchi is shown to be able to be reborn from fire (the fiery feathers it shed on an occasion and the general connection to fire further confirm that). Kagutsuchi also is capable of melee fighting, and has a jet mode which allows it to travel at high speeds. The sword in its head, the Sword of Sealing, made by the Obsidian Lord, acts as a seal on its powers, allowing the Obsidian Lord to suppress it when needed. During the final battle, the HiME's attack on the HiME star weakens the Obsidian Lord and destroys the sword, loosening the control and allows Kagutsuchi full access to all its power to destroy the Obsidian Lord within Reito.

In the beginning of the series, Kagutsuchi appears to be by far the strongest Child among other HiME's childs. Toward the end of the series, when stronger Childs appear (e.g. Shizuru's Kiyohime and Mikoto's real Miroku), Kagutsuchi's power is challenged. However, when its seal is finally removed, it is doubtful that there is any Child that can come close to its power. Kagustuchi is also the only child shown to actually resist death; once, when Alyssa attacked Mai and her friends with Artemis' Golden Lightning, Mai sacrificed herself by flying herself and Kagutsuchi into the path of the lightning, protecting everyone while incinerating herself and Kagutsuchi. However, Kagutsuchi merely reformed into its jet form, Mai regenerating on top of its head and, without Mai's command or consent, flew into space, dodging all of Atremis' subsequent attacks and destroying the other child. Though Mai seemingly died (again) in the explosion, she was shown alive and well the very next day. In the manga, she starts off with her trademark rings already as a HiME and is fairly skilled at fighting. Her Key is Yuuichi Tate, and her Child is Kagutsuchi. When she becomes a QUEEN, she becomes even more powerful and is able to summon a darker Kagutsuchi without the use of a Key. She gains two larger rings of fire floating behind her back, in addition to her standard 4 rings.

In the My-HiME manga series, Mai is still a hardworking person who fusses over Takumi and is reluctant to tell others of her troubles. She is a current student at Fuuka Academy and part of the Anti-Orphan Squad. She and Natsuki are fierce rivals, each one despising the other's attitude.

Mai first appears in chapter 1, crying and passing by Yuuichi. She later is seen in a battle with Natsuki, during which Mai learns that Yuuichi is her (and Natsuki's) Key. Mai, Tate and Natsuki quickly form a love triangle. Although Mai initially pushes Yuuichi away, they become closer while fighting off Orphans and the Ori-HiME Team in the following chapters. In chapter 22, Mai and Yuuichi kiss while she is recovering in the infirmary, a fact which other characters seemingly know about and later causes emotional stress for Natsuki - so much so that she and Yuuichi can't even touch, let alone summon. When Mai learns of the link between Childs and Keys in chapter 26, she pushes Yuuichi away so as not to risk getting him killed. She almost becomes a PRINCESS, but instead joins with the Anti-Orphan Squad in chapter 28 to prevent Searrs from opening the Gate to the HiME Star. She and Yuuichi defeat Mikoto and Shiho and make it to the Gate just before Saeko Kuga opens it in chapter 35. While the Anti-Orphan Squad decides what to do in chapter 36, Mai finds out that Takumi has died from his illness. In the next chapter, Mai once again pushes Yuuichi away from her and falls into a deep depression. She stays at the hospital and is witness to her brother's awakening as the Obsidian Lord. Mai eventually joins her brother's side and becomes the last of the QUEENs. QUEEN Mai is confronted by Yuuichi and Natsuki in chapter 39, and after a battle against Natsuki's powered up Duran, Yuuichi convinces her to help stop her brother. They confront Takumi, but he is absorbed by the HiME Star and used to create the Star's Child in chapter 43. Mai, Yuuichi, and Natsuki defeat the Child and save Takumi by using the Sword of Kagutsuchi. At the end of the manga, Mai and Natsuki continue to fight each other over Yuuichi although the two have become friends in all other matters.

A beautiful, forceful, cold and aloof individual. She rides a fictional Ducati model sportsbike called Ducati DRIII. Her only friend at the start of the series is Shizuru Fujino; she prefers to work alone, but over the course of the series warms up to Mai Tokiha. Natsuki also works with Kaiji Sakomizu and Yamada to carry out her missions during the course of the series. Although in the same school year as Mai, she explains that she is in fact a year older because she stayed away from school for a year due to an accident, making her 17 at the end of the series. Natsuki hates Takeda who is a stalker and a pervert. Natsuki's Elements are a pair of small pistols, with the spheres on the pistols providing it with unlimited ammunition. She also displays knowledge of hand-to-hand fighting techniques. Her birthday is on August 15. In the carnival it was revealed that Shizuru is Natsuki's most important person but because of Shizuru's psychotic rampage Natsuki began to doubt her feelings. In the chapel of the Fuuka Academy Shizuru and Natsuki fought to the limit. In this fight Duran, Natsuki's Child, became large as Kiyohime signifying that her feelings for her most important person is much stronger then. This means that Natsuki also loves Shizuru as Shizuru loves her. Natsuki's HiME mark is located on her lower left back, an area said to be governed by Leo, her zodiac sign.

In the My-HiME manga, Natsuki Kuga is a typical tsundere character involved in a love triangle with Mai Tokiha and Yuuichi Tate, the latter being the Key for both girls. Natsuki shows a rivalry with Mai in the first chapter, indicating the two were fighting since before Yuuichi appeared. Natsuki's inability to do housework and her fondness of mayonnaise is more emphasized in the manga than in the anime.

Natsuki remains the same in the manga except she appears able to control ice to some extent erecting an ice wall in Chapter 15 to protect Tate. She, along with Mai, still has her HiME mark on her lower-left back. Natsuki's Child is Duran, similar to the anime version but named after the doll her mother gave her. It has the same cartridges as the anime version, although Silver Cartridges actually encase the target in ice. The Duran used by Natsuki's mother used a new type of Cartridge called 'Plutonium Cartridge' - highly explosive shells much more powerful than the Chrome Cartridges. Natsuki's Duran had one more transformation to go through and it became Golden Duran. It also became able to fire Diamond Cartridges, which freeze the molecules of their target with 'absolute zero' temperatures. This is the form that Natsuki used to defeat QUEEN Mai and a Dark Kagutsuchi in a one-on-one battle. Natsuki's Key is Yuuichi Tate in the manga version.

A member of the Fuuka Academy Student Council. He first appears in the same ferry that Mai Tokiha is taking and the two quickly form bad impressions of each other. Shiho Munakata calls him her older brother even though they are not related by blood.  He works with the Student Council doing odd jobs for them (prompting Mai to label him a "lackey") and sits next to Mai in class.

Yuuichi used to be a member of the Fuuka kendo club and regularly made it into the nationals until he suffered a severe injury to his knee at some point in the past, though the exact circumstances and nature of the injury are never explained in the anime. Masashi Takeda of the kendo club is seen looking sadly at Yuuichi's name card on the wall of the kendo dojo at one point during the anime. Disenchanted, after his injury Yuuchi became a feared delinquent, but Shiho manages to convince him give up his antisocial ways. Despite the external mutual dislike, it is clear that Yuuichi has feelings for Mai. While they did not get along in the beginning, their attitudes towards each other softened somewhat after episode 5, when Mai breaks down and is comforted by Yuuichi. He happens to witness Mai as she is about to kiss Reito Kanzaki and tries to halt the budding relationship, much to Shiho's distress. After Shiho is attacked by the SEARRS Orphan he becomes suspicious about the recent events at the school and tries to convince Mai to tell him what's happening.

After the insecure and possessive Shiho realizes that Mai and Yuuichi are developing feelings for each other, she becomes mentally unbalanced and makes Yuuichi kiss her in front of Mai, playing on Yuuichi's guilt that he was unable to prevent her from being hurt. He becomes the Most Important Person for both Mai and Shiho and ends up paying for this when Shiho's Child dies at Mikoto's hands, resulting in his own death (ironically, he had realized this and urged Mai to destroy Yatagarasu herself; when Mai couldn't do it, the maddened Mikoto dealt the killing blow). Just before he disappears, Mai confesses her feelings for him and tries to kiss him. Eventually he is revived by Mashiro Kazahana and comes to Mai's defense using Miyu's discarded sword when the possessed Reito attempts to attack her. Tate swears to protect Mai and shouts that he loves her, much to Mai's relief. Despite this, at the end of the series both of them are still being claimed by both Reito and Mikoto, and Shiho respectively.

In the manga, Yuuichi is the one who is the transfer student rather than Mai.  He finds out that he is the Key to both Mai and Natsuki, two well-known rivals at the school, exasperating and intensifying their mutual antipathy. Because of his dual Key status, he is often referred to as a 'Perverted Beast' by his classmates. His relationship with Mai is much like the one in the anime, although there are further complications. i.e., Natsuki. Yuuichi was forcefully dismissed from his former school's kendo club after he attempted to stop the sexual assault of Shiho, costing his team the championships because of their disqualification. During the assault, one of the roughnecks pulled a knife out, and gave him a long gash proceeding from his elbow down to his wrist on his left arm. He is extremely sensitive about it, and it is the reason he refuses to join Fuka's club despite team captain Takeda's insistence.

Miyu initially appears as a girl in Mai's class and the adopted daughter of Joseph Greer, the resident priest of Fuuka Academy. She is friendly towards Mai, making strange comments about the exact temperature and amount of precipitation, and is very protective of Alyssa Searrs.

After encountering Akane Higurashi, whom she saw fighting an Orphan, Miyu is revealed to be an android created by Joseph Greer of the SEARRS organization to protect Alyssa, as being a "fake" HiME Alyssa is unable to materialize an element and hence relies on Miyu for protection. Her name is an acronym for Multiple Intelligencial Yggdrasil Unit. She lures Akane out with an Orphan and forces her to summon her Child, Hari, and upon defeating the Orphan Miyu kills Hari with her anti-materializing weapon, and by extension Akane's boyfriend Kazuya, demonstrating the dire consequences of losing in the HiME Carnival. She is later seen observing the HiME via a surveillance room in the basement of the Church and looking after Alyssa until Natsuki Kuga arrives and confronts them only to be knocked out, though Miyu advises Greer not to kill her because it "is unwise to kill a Valkyrie without her Child present".

When the true intentions of the SEARRS organization - to replace the real HiMEs with Alyssa and hence gain control of the power of the Obsidian Lord - become clear Miyu takes an active role against the HiME, though with the combined efforts of the HiME and Alyssa's Child's defeat she flees with Alyssa in the hope of finding safety. However, Joseph Greer, who had earlier been dismissed for incompetence after finding that the codes he had installed in Miyu had all been erased, appears and shoots Alyssa before himself being dispatched by Miyu in retaliation. As Alyssa dies Miyu is visibly distraught and cries that the "Golden Light" she loved has faded. She carries Alyssa's body into a frozen lake, where it is assumed Miyu herself perished.

However, in episode 23 it is revealed that Mashiro salvaged Miyu and reformatted her and several pieces of SEARRS technology, introducing a new element into the HiME Carnival that the Obsidian Lord could not anticipate. She is revived by Midori Sugiura before fighting Mikoto and assisting the HiME indirectly. A small presence in the form of a flame that spoke with Alyssa's voice activated Miyu's "Platinum Mode" and anti-Materialiser weapon during the final battle that assisted Mashiro in her escape from the crystal she was trapped in, and the resurrection of the defeated HiME.  In the end Alyssa is revived by Mashiro with the other HiME, and Miyu is seen becoming a nun along with Nao Yuuki in the Fuuka church with Alyssa by her side.

One of the classmates for Mai, whom she sits directly behind, and Yuuichi Tate. She offers her friendship on Mai's first day, introducing herself by poking Mai's sides playfully. She uses her cell phone's camera frequently to give interviews and is always searching for new gossip around the school, which develops into a running gag about her character. She and Aoi Senou appear in an omake as super deformed versions of themselves to give a rundown of their class, classifying Mai as being in the "Biggest Breast Ranking". After the events of the HiME festival progress become dangerous enough for the Fuuka students to be dismissed, Chie and Aoi reluctantly leave Mai behind, though the other girl insists she can handle herself. In the end they return and are last seen at a picnic with the resurrected HiME.

Her role in the manga was more or less non-existent as Tate Yuuichi is the protagonist and Mai's relationships with her classmates are unexplored. She only shows up for a cameo role as one of the announcers during the battle between the Anti Orphan Squad and Ori-HiME unit to determine who are the strongest HiME in the school, and a few later cameo appearances.

One of Mai's coworkers who is fairly bashful. She is Kazuya Kurauchi's girlfriend.  As a Hime, Kazuya is her key.  Early on in the series, Akane is asked to assist attack an Orphan by Miyu Greer. Akane reluctantly helps, summoning her Child Hari, a tiger shaped robot, and her Element, a pair of tonfa to help attack the Orphan.  After fighting it, she confesses her identity as a Hime to Kazuya, only to have Miyu slay Hari, killing Kazuya in front of a horrified Akane.  At the end of the anime, Kazuya is shown to have been resurrected alongside the other Keys and he and Akane are in a relationship.

Sayuri is part of a trio of friends with Yayoi and Miya.

Yukino is the introverted secretary of the Fuka Academy student council. She is a longtime friend and supporter of Haruka Suzushiro. In the manga Haruka actually is a HiME, and Yukino is a member of the Ori-HiME team along with Haruka who is her key. Together they form a tag-team when fighting Orphans. Instead of Diana she now has a Child called Mirror Wall which resembles an open flower (instead of a closed one in the anime) that floats above ground. It abilities appear to be more powerful than in the anime, as are several other HiMEs Childs, as its spy camera spores are large enough to reflect Haruka's child's laser attacks. Mirror Wall appears to be able to create more precise illusions than Diana and can erect forceshields strong enough to deflects blasts from Kagatsuchi, but in turn seems to be completely without offensive abilities.

 
 Kazuya is Mai's classmate and coworker, and Akane Higurashi's boyfriend.

Yayoi is very short, and has a sort of admiration for Akira Okuzaki. She is usually seen with Sayuri and Miya.

Aoi enjoys teasing Mai with Chie Harada. She is also fond of cute younger students.

The part of a trio of friends with Yayoi and Sayuri.

Third-year students 

Shizuru is the calm president of the Fuka Academy student council. She often has a tea cup in hand and has a distinctive Kyoto accent (or Southern accent in the English dub). She has her own fan club that follows her anywhere. In the anime series, she harbors a secret obsessive infatuation with Natsuki Kuga, whom she considers her most important person. During the battle royale, she confesses to Natsuki and goes out of her way to protect her, but the latter requests time to sort out her feelings. They later remove themselves from the tournament by killing each other, but are resurrected in the final episode. Natsuki accepts Shizuru's feelings after giving Takeda a letter explaining her rejection. Shizuru has won two character popularity polls at Sunrise Studio's official website.

 
The Vice President of Fuuka Academy's Student Council alongside President Shizuru Fujino. A calm person, he is popular with the female students of the school, but shows romantic interest in Mai Tokiha. Reito's calm and reserved personality often clashes with that of Executive Committee head Haruka Suzushiro, whose annoyance with him is made evident several times. Reito shows kindness by taking Mai's brother Takumi and his roommate Akira with him on official business to a fancy restaurant free of charge.

Reito does not appear in the original My-HiME manga. Instead, the Obsidan Lord possesses Takumi Tokiha. He appears in the My-HiME EXA manga due to the similarities between it and the anime. It is unknown at this time if he still plays host to the Obsidian Lord.

Hot-tempered Haruka Suzushiro is a member of the Fuuka Academy Student Council. She is first introduced when interrogating Mai Tokiha. She has a tendency towards malapropism. She is Yukino Kikukawa's best friend and often protected the younger girl in earlier years, but also bosses her around. She has a strong (and mostly one-sided) rivalry with Shizuru Fujino, who she often refers to as "bubuzuke" (tea with rice). Much of her strong dislike of Shizuru comes from the result of the Student Council Elections in which they both ran, where Shizuru won in landslide of 817 with only 12 votes for Haruka. However, Haruka recovered from this loss and became the passionate and commanding Executive Director of the Suzushiro Executive Team, and often deals with the dirty work or otherwise humiliating tasks that the Student Council would rather not do.

When Shizuru goes missing to take care of an injured Natsuki Kuga, Yukino tracks her down with Haruka following. From their hideout they observe Shizuru stealing a kiss from the sleeping Natsuki, with Haruka giving their presence away by her shocked reaction. In a confrontation with Shizuru, Haruka declares her horror at the other girl's actions and calls her infatuation with Natsuki "disgusting" and ends up slapping Shizuru. Because Haruka is the most important person of Yukino she ends up "dying" because of Shizuru's retaliation attack on Diana. Before she "dies", however, she manages to headbutt Shizuru and reassures Yukino, to whom she gives her council badge as she fades away. Haruka is later resurrected by Mashiro and appears floating before Yukino before comically falling to the ground. By the end of the series, she passes her position in the student council to Yukino, but not before making one more spelling mistake on a warning sign. In an extended ending of the final episode, it reveals that Haruka and Shizuru have ended up in the same university, and that Shizuru has once again beaten Haruka in the top standings, much to Haruka's chagrin.

In the My-HiME manga, Haruka is actually a HiME, and unlike many of the characters, she actually has a larger role. Her element is a massive mace that she fights with that causes heavy damage to her foes. Her Child is a large and grotesque marine creature (most resembling an angler fish) called Koumokuten. It fires destructive laser beams from its mouth. In the manga, she tag teams with her partner Yukino, who is also her Key, to form a perfectly balanced fighting pair: she handles offense while Yukino handles defense, with both of them covering each other's backs. The two are even able to combine their Childs into a single being, capable of firing an incredibly destructive laser at their opponents.

The kanji in the name of Haruka's Otome GEM references her My-HiME surname, which when broken down into individual kanji, mean "Jewel" "Island" and "Castle" respectively. This is reflected in the name of her My-Otome GEM, the Continental Orb Topaz (or 珠洲の黄玉 Suzu no Kōgyoku). Her given name means far off or distant.

Masashi Takeda is the chief of the kendo club. He is in love with Natsuki Kuga, despite the fact that she does not return these feelings. He tends to appear in situations where Natsuki is in a compromising position (such as having her skirt blown up by the wind after her panties are stolen). He tries to make Yuuichi Tate return to the kendo club in vain. In the novel "Natsuki's Prelude" it is revealed that after the HiME Carnival Natsuki sent a letter to Takeda with an apology and an explanation that she could not return his feelings, because she needed to accept someone else's (this person being Shizuru Fujino).

In the manga, Takeda is still the chief of the kendo club, and he met Yuuichi Tate in front of the school when Yuuichi transferred to Fuuka Academy at the beginning of the manga. He is a fan of this universe's Natsuki. Later, he becomes the Key to Nao Yuuki after she is forced to change her Key.

Middle school 

Mikoto Minagi plays an important role in Mai Tokiha's story, while she has her own plot as well. She is a third-grade middle school student in the same class as Nao Yuuki. She loves to be with Mai, often at her side or clinging to her, and playing with Mai's large breasts. She also has a problem with spicy food, and consuming it often sends her into rampages while looking for water. Mikoto is usually seen with her two-handed sword, Miroku, either in hand or in a black sword bag.

In the manga, much like in the anime, Mikoto wields Miroku and is capable in using an attack that can split the ground called Tosotsuken, a.k.a. Tusita Sword. Mai states that Mikoto is the strongest of the HiMEs and can defeat the other HiMEs' Childs. Mikoto's Child and Key are not revealed; in fact, Mikoto herself states in chapter 11 that she doesn't have or need a Key, although this might just be boasting on her part. There is also no mention of Mikoto having a brother, since Reito never appeared in the manga. In a flashback, Mikoto didn't seem to trust anyone, and acted like an angry cat hissing at anyone who came near. Thanks to Mai, she started opening up. In one chapter, she took care of an OPRHAN with only Akira knowing of its existence. Mikoto said it was just like her back in the day. She was forced to destroy it when it awakened to its true nature. Mikoto falls under the control of Shiho Munakata in chapter 30, forcing Mai to fight her. Later, Mikoto, Akira, and Nao Yuuki face off against Yang Guifei in chapter 39. The three and the QUEEN are absorbed by the HiME Star, but are freed when the HiME Star's Child is defeated.

Shiho Munakata is a childhood friend of Yuuichi Tate, whom she affectionately calls her brother (onii-chan) despite the fact that they are not related. She is in the Fuka Middle school, and quickly makes friends with Mai Tokiha and Mikoto Minagi. She is a miko at her grandfather's shrine. She is very possessive of Yuuichi and is in love with him, and even expresses to Mai that she wishes to marry him.  The fact that her hairstyle makes her look like an octopus is something of a running gag in the early episodes of the series, as well as her sporadic movement of her hair and its reaction to her moods.

In the manga Shiho is still the childhood friend of Tate. Tate was kicked out of his former school due to an incident where he tried to stop Shiho's sexual assault by several gang members, which resulted in a long scar on his arm (it is unclear what happened to Shiho after that). She appears later in the storyline as a PRINCESS, an artificially created HiME, to protect Tate and restart her life. She takes control of Mikoto Minagi for a time using her Child's abilities. She is eventually defeated by Mai after Shiho begins to lose her mental balance, due to the approaching influence of the HiME star. After she loses her PRINCESS powers, and is thus freed from the influence of the HiME star, she is seen attempting to help in the battle against the Obsidian Lord, though there is little she can do. In the end she is still clinging to Yuuichi, re-igniting Mai and Natsuki's rivalry over Yuuichi. Since she is a PRINCESS in the manga, Shiho is without her animated incarnation's element and child. Instead, she has an octopus-like child which has a variety of powers, though its most prominent one is the ability to take control of an enemy through the use of spores, which themselves resemble octopuses.

 

Akira is the roommate of Mai Tokiha's younger brother Takumi Tokiha and attends the Fuka Middle school with him. Akira's strong-willed and forceful personality contrasts with Takumi's kind and (relatively) feminine attitude and is extremely private, setting up a curtain and strict boundaries for the room. Akira is also a student of Ishigami, the art teacher.

In the tenth episode ("Cake Wars") Akira assists Takumi in baking a cake for his sister Mai and setting up a surprise party for her. When Takumi is attacked by an Orphan after sending Akira to buy icing sugar for the cake. He is then rescued by a masked ninja, who despite obviously being Akira, asks that the "Secret Ninja of the School"'s identity be kept secret by him. At the end of the episode Akira is seen disrobing to tend to a wound incurred while fighting the Orphan, revealing not only her true gender, which has been kept secret for years, but the fact that she too is a HiME.

Eventually Akira's true identity is accidentally discovered by Takumi (Takumi barged in the bathroom as Akira was drying herself after a shower). Despite her orders to kill anyone who learns of her secret, she keeps Takumi alive, but makes him swear to silence. It also becomes evident that they have begun to develop deep feelings for each other, which becomes significant as the events of the HiME carnival progress. It is later shown that one of her books turns out to be her drawing book, which is filled with her drawings of Takumi. When Nao Yuuki tries to abduct Takumi as revenge against Mai, Akira intervenes with her Child and flees into the forest with Takumi.

Unfortunately Mikoto Minagi is also in the forest, and influenced by the Obsidian Prince, Mikoto appears to be the one to destroy Akira's Child, Gennai, in the process taking Takumi's life, as he was Akira's most important person and had his life force connected to the Child. A distressed Akira collapses after this, and is later seen being carried off by members of her father's clan. It is later revealed, however, that Mikoto was not the one to defeat Akira and kill Takumi, but Shiho Munakata with her Child Yatagarasu in order to hurt Mai. In the final episode she is seen under their care tied to a wooden post when Mashiro revives the fallen HiME and their most important people, including Takumi. After participating in the final battle against the Obsidian Lord, Akira travels to America with Takumi where he receives surgery for his heart condition.

Her Child in My-HiME, a huge frog-like creature named Gennai, is able to blind enemies with the giant spotlights on its back, allowing Akira to "pin" the enemy's shadow the ground and allow Gennai to execute its Jigoku Gama (literally "Hell Toad") attack, which involves Gennai launching a huge spiked ball out of its mouth towards the enemy. Akira's HiME mark is located on her upper right back; this location differs from that of medical astrology which is generally followed with the HiME's birthmarks (the body part associated with Taurus are the neck and throat.)

Gennai is also summoned with the long incantation "Rin, Pyou (or Byou), Tou, Sha, Kai, Jin, Retsu, Zai, Zen (Kuji-in), Gennai, Appearance!". However, since its first appearance, Gennai hasn't been summoned in this manner; indeed, since Takumi was at the scene, this could have only been an act to help dissuade him from making any unwanted connections. Her Element is a double-bladed kunai that she can summon with the word "on", although she has also been seen to summon smaller shuriken to use as throwing weapons. However, as with Gennai, this has only been the case with its initial appearance, as all others had it being summoned wordlessly. The kunai seems to be able to interact with one's shadow, as in one of its few uses, it pinned an Orphan in place after Akira threw the kunai into the Orphan's shadow. Her Child was killed by Yatagarasu (Shiho's Child). In the manga her element is much larger, and she is never seen summoning her Child, so the identity of her Key is unknown.

In the manga Akira is blackmailed by Haruka Suzushiro into joining the Ori-HiME Team in order to keep her identity a secret. She often visits Takumi, who is much sicker in the manga, to give him notes as the class representative, though her relationship with him goes unexplored. She becomes good friends with Mikoto Minagi, who had been her enemy until they resolved their differences after Mikoto rescued her. At the end of the manga, Akira is seen wearing a girls school uniform, Mikoto checks to see if she is wearing a bra.

Mai and Takumi are first seen on a ferry boat on their way to Fuuka Academy, which is a new school for them. Takumi sees something in the water, and it turns out to be a girl named Mikoto Minagi, a girl who nearly drowned, and Mai performs CPR on her. Later on, the ferry is under attack by Natsuki Kuga who is looking for Mikoto, and the ferry is destroyed by Natsuki's and Mikoto's battle. Takumi and Shiho Munakata are separated from Yuuichi Tate and Mai, until she arrives unexpectedly on the school grounds the next morning. He suffers from a heart condition and he has to take tablets that he always carries around. When they were children Mai was supposed to watch Takumi, but instead went off to play with a friend. Takumi went into a river, and being unable to swim, his mother had to rescue him, which caused her to be hospitalized and later die.

Takumi is placed in the Middle School, and is assigned to be roommates with Akira Okuzaki, the most popular boy in their class (who is, in fact, a girl hiding her true gender). Akira initially avoids Takumi, but later on both of them began developing deep feeling for each other. Akira has a part in helping Takumi make a cake for Mai's birthday in episode 10, and after an Orphan attacks Takumi, a disguised Akira appears and slays the Orphan. Takumi asks if the ninja is Akira, who denies it, despite the obviousness of the situation. Later on, Takumi discovers Akira is really a girl, and she threatens to kill him. He is involved with the battle of the HiMEs, since he is Akira's Most Important Person; this causes his death when Akira's Child, Gennai, is defeated by Mikoto (this is an ironic point in the show, as Mikoto only killed Gennai in order to protect Mai; this causes Mai great trauma upon her brother's death, although it is later revealed that Shiho Munakata was the one to defeat Akira and kill Takumi in order to hurt Mai ). Takumi is later revived with the other HiME and other people who evaporated by Mashiro Kazahana at the end of the series. He also is with Akira in America, getting a heart transplant and sends a letter to Mai saying that he is okay and that he'll be back before the vacations ends.

Takumi's role in the manga version is severely reduced. He is more sickly in this version, being in the hospital a lot, with Akira constantly visiting him. Akira and Takumi's relationship is unexplored in the manga. Instead of Reito, who is nonexistent in the manga, Takumi is the host of the Obsidian Lord, and actually dies before being revived by the power of the Obsidian Lord. Later, Mai, Natsuki, and Yuuchi manage to defeat the HIME star with the Sword of Kagutsuchi and saved Takumi. In the final chapter, Takumi is back to normal health and in perfect condition seeing how the Obsidian Lord is now gone from within his body. He is seen with Yuuichi unpacking his belongings at Fuka Academy and asked Yuuichi for kendo lessons.

Nao is a morally ambivalent Fuka Academy middle school student who robs perverted men. In the manga, Nao's role as an antagonist is much more defined, and her original Key was the leader of the gang who tried to rape Shiho and inflicted an injury on Yuuichi Tate. Her first major act in the manga is an attempted seduction of Tate for blackmail purposes. Julia also appears to be much stronger, as her webs are nearly indestructible and managed to immobilize Mai and Kagutsuchi until Yuuichi freed them. Her character is used to demonstrate the effect a Child's death has on the Key, though Nao shows more concern over Julia. After her Child is defeated by Miyu, it is revealed that a Child can be reborn when Nao forcefully obtains Takeda as her new Key. At the end, she fights Yang Guifei alongside Mikoto and Akira to save the world. The director of My-HiME, Masakazu Ohara, has said the following on Nao: "Nao's an interesting study. She isn't necessarily friendly, but that doesn't make her a bad person. The theme surrounding her is that of someone living for herself, and it makes for a good plot device."

Grade school 

Alyssa first appears in the Fuuka Academy choir, where she is well known around the school for her wonderful singing voice and is commonly called the "Golden Angel". Mikoto Minagi and Mai Tokiha encounter her on a hillside singing with Miyu Greer during a day off, where they exchange a few words. Alyssa is frequently seen clinging to Miyu, and rarely speaks unless spoken to, coming off as very shy and timid. She is in the Fuuka elementary school.

In the manga, Alyssa is actually the younger sister of Natsuki Kuga having been artificially created from her DNA and the DNA of the Searrs president, and while she is still protected by Miyu her personality is much more playful and child-like, and she enjoys glomping her sister. Her child is a floating orb-like machine called Isaac that can manipulate gravity, and instead of glowing golden her hair turns jet black like Natsuki's when her powers are activated. She is also not a member of the school choir and does not sing at all.

Fuka Academy staff 

The priest at the Fuka Academy church and Miyu's adoptive father.

A maid serving Mashiro Kazahana, the Director of Fuka Academy. Since Mashiro needs a wheelchair, she is almost always accompanied by Fumi, who propels the wheelchair. When Mashiro resurrects the fallen HiME and their most important persons, Fumi returns to normal. After the Obsidian Lord is defeated, she parts ways with Nagi and Mashiro, who leave through a gate at the far end of the library to "go back where they belong". Just before leaving, Nagi hands Fumi his book, which is seen to have the words "Fuka Academy" and the academy logo on its cover, and later, during the graduation ceremony, Fumi addresses the students as the new Director. Fumi's Element takes the form of a large scythe, and her Child in the anime is actually Mashiro, called Suishouhime (meaning Crystal Princess) in her Child form.

An art teacher who enjoys painting portraits.

A teacher easily identified by his afro. He enjoys gardening and serves as an informant to Natsuki.

Mashiro is depicted as a small girl with lavender hair. She normally has a leadership role; in My-HiME she is the chairwoman of Fuka Academy. She usually has a dedicated maid. In the later parts of My-HiME, her body was shown to be in a crystal.

In the manga version of My-HiME, Mashiro remains much the same as in the anime, except that she is both a regular human and a HiME and Fumi is her Key. She is not connected to Nagi or the Lord Kokuyou; rather, the Kazahana clan is traditionally responsible for stopping the HiME star from landing on Earth. Her Element is a large gold pocketwatch that allows her to slow time in conjunction with her Child, a white rabbit (though it manifests itself as five individual rabbits). She only uses this once, though, to stop Alyssa Searrs after being freed by Natsuki. She is still calm and reserved as she is in the anime, although in the manga, she is a bit more outspoken and shows more emotion, mainly coy and cheery smiles that seem to make a situation a bit comedic. The fake Mashiro initially has the Sky Blue Sapphire, which he uses in a bugged provisional contract with Arika which later becomes official. Mashiro also receives the ring of the Black Smoke Chrysoberyl, making him the master of Nina. Erstin states she also has a contract with Mashiro in the final chapter. The real Mashiro is capable of hurling balls of dark energy and creating temporal illusions. She is able to resurrect HiME, although she isn't able to control them until after her death at the beginning of the story.

 The resident nun of the Fuka Academy Church, and along with Father Joseph Greer she gives counsel to students seeking advice. She was raised in a convent and has had little contact with men for most of her life. In the second episode she reassures members of the Fuka kendo team that the "Demon cat" they saw running around the school is merely a result of their youthful passions (it was actually a rampaging Mikoto Minagi).

A school nurse and a friend of Midori's from college. Drives a Mitsubishi Lancer Evolution.

A former coworker of Mai and an avid archaeologist who later becomes Mai's homeroom/history teacher.

Others 

Nagi makes his first appearance in the first episode of the My-HiME anime commenting that another HiME has arrived. He is first seen conversing with Mashiro Kazahana and Fumi Himeno after the latter two meet Mai Tokiha for the first time and he comments on Mai's HiME status. Later in the same episode, Nagi appears to Mai and Natsuki Kuga, and implies that her brother Takumi Tokiha is threatened by an Orphan, and as Mai strives to protect him, Nagi introduces her to her HiME powers and her Child, Kagutsuchi.

Nagi is an observer to the awakening of several more HiMEs, and also acts as a sort of referee to prevent fights between them. It is revealed that he is behind the Orphan attacks on Fuka Academy; both Fumi and Mashiro (who mentions Nagi being part of the First District) are aware of this, as is Natsuki, who reluctantly leaves him alone as long as he discloses the Orphans' directions.

Soon, however, Orphans of another kind come into play, catching even Nagi by surprise as he is not aware who sends them. The other Orphan master turns out to be Alyssa Searrs, an artificial HiME created by the Searrs Foundation with the goal of disposing of all other HiME. Nagi, still staying in the shadows, aids the other HiME in their quest to protect Fuka Academy from the Searrs Foundation.

After Searrs's plans are foiled and Alyssa is killed, Nagi appears before the "HiME Rangers", newly formed by Midori Sugiura to more efficiently protect Fuka against Orphans, and tells them that Orphans will not be appearing any more — instead, the HiME will have to fight each other's Childs until only one HiME retains her powers, as part of the HiME Carnival that occurs every 300 years,. He is later revealed — along with the First District — to be a servant to the Obsidian Lord, the ancient power behind the HiME Carnival, and that Nagi himself witnessed previous HiME Carnivals, which would make him several centuries old.

As the HiME Star descends to Fuka Academy, Nagi guides Mai (the only HiME remaining by that point, bar Mikoto Minagi) through Valhalla's Gate to the HiME star and to her final showdown with Mikoto and the Obsidian Lord. He then tries to prevent Miyu Greer from following Mai's footsteps into the hall with the pillars representing HiME, but his attempt  to stop is Miyu unsuccessful and, to his shock, she unleashes her ultimate "Platinum" mode, shattering the crystal in which Mashiro's real body is encased and freeing her.

After the Obsidian Lord is defeated, Nagi's eyes glow yellow and he screams, clutching his head. When he regains consciousness, he laments his failure to prevent the HiME from cheating their fate. He is last seen conversing with Mashiro and Fumi; he comments that the destruction of the HiME Star made the future less certain. Nagi and Mashiro then decide to "go back where they belong" and disappear in a pitch black room behind a massive gate, which then closes behind them, leaving Fumi behind.

John Smith works for the Searrs Foundation. His job is to tie up loose ends previously made by Searrs.

Yamada is an information broker whom Natsuki uses.

 ( in the English version)
The First District is an organization that is responsible for gathering the HiMEs to the Academy.

The Searrs Foundation is an ancient organization disguised as a U.S. corporation, attempting to gain the power of the HiMEs.

References

External links
 http://www.sunrise-inc.co.jp/my-hime/
 http://www.my-zhime.net/

My-HiME
My-HiME